Murche is an abandoned village in the Ahal Region of Turkmenistan. The site is famed for the Mausoleum of Zengi Baba.

History 
Upon construction of the Karakum Canal to its north in the 1960s, inhabitants of Murche settled at a new site closer to the canal. Murche was left to ruins and crumbling mud-walls and doorways are all that survives.

Turkmen archaeologists have rebuilt a mud-tower and fireplace in traditional style — imparting feels of antiquity.

Mausoleum of Zengi Baba 
The most preeminent shrine of Zangi Baba, this mausoleum dates either from the 13th-14th centuries, when bricks taken from earlier establishments were put to reuse, or the 10th-11th centuries and then reconstructed a few centuries later.

It is a square building with an over-span dome — transition between walls and dome is marked with four niche-separated squinches. The cenotaph is tiled with different geometric patterns. Outside the mausoleum, a large collection of ovoid objects (prob. cannon balls; ascribed to be dinosaur eggs in local tradition) and stones of peculiar appearance (esp. ammolites) are preserved and imparted with sacred functions.

References

Further reading 

Former villages in Turkmenistan